Rafael Cameron (born 1951) is a Guyanese American singer-songwriter best known for his boogie song "Boogie's Gonna Get Ya", which was remixed by François Kevorkian. His most successful single in his career was, however, "Magic Of You (Like The Way)"/"Get It Off".

His albums and singles were produced by Randy Muller of Skyy.

Career
In 1980, Cameron was signed to a prominent disco and post-disco label Salsoul Records. He recorded three albums in total, which all entered the Billboard pop and R&B charts. All of his work was mostly written by Randy Muller and the Cameron himself. His most successful work include singles like "Let's Get It Off" (Club #17), "Magic of You" (R&B #16) and "Funtown U.S.A."  (Club #55).

Studio albums

Singles

Other singles
1982: "Desires" (Salsoul-SG 373)
1982: "Shake It Down"  (Salsoul-S7 7035) - R&B #81
1981: "All That's Good To Me" (Salsoul-SALT 10) - UK release only
1981: "Daisy" (Salsoul-SG 355)

References

1951 births
Salsoul Records artists
American boogie musicians
American funk singers
Living people
American people of Guyanese descent